The Stetson Hatters women's basketball team represents Stetson University in DeLand, Florida, United States. The school's team currently competes in the ASUN Conference.

History

Stetson played sparingly from 1906 to 1930, playing games against colleges but mostly playing against high school teams. In 1931, the varsity team was discontinued, staying that way until 1946. However, the team was discontinued again in 1948. The modern era began in 1975 with the restoration of the team to varsity level. They joined Division I in 1981. Since joining the Atlantic Sun, they have won the tournament in 1989, 2005, 2011, and 2013, going to the NCAA Tournament in the last three. They have lost in the First Round each time. They have also made appearances in the WNIT in 2012, 2014, 2015, 2017 along with the WBI in 2016. As of the end of the 2015–16 season, the Hatters have an all-time record of 511–645.

NCAA tournament results

References

External links